Wilfrid William Henry Thomas (1875–1953) was the inaugural Bishop of Brandon.

He was born in Tenby in 1875 and educated at Reading School. Ordained in 1898, he began his career as Curate of Christ's Church Cathedral, Hamilton, Ontario after which he held incumbencies in Winnipeg and Selkirk. From 1916 to 1924 he was Archdeacon of East Manitoba when he was elevated to the episcopate.

Notes

1875 births
People from Tenby
People educated at Reading School
Anglican archdeacons in North America
Anglican bishops of Brandon
20th-century Anglican Church of Canada bishops
1953 deaths